Brachygystia is a monotypic moth genus in the family Cossidae. Its sole species, Brachygystia mauretanicus, is found in Tunisia, Morocco, Algeria and Mauritania.

References

Natural History Museum Lepidoptera generic names catalog

Cossinae
Monotypic moth genera
Moths described in 1907
Moths of Africa